Soyuz TM-24 was the 27th expedition to Mir. Soyuz TM-24 carried a crew of three. The crew consisted of Cosmonauts Valery Korzun and Aleksandr Kaleri, and the first French woman in space, Claudie André-Deshays. They joined American astronaut Shannon Lucid and Mir 21 crewmates Yuri Onufriyenko and Yuri Usachev. André-Deshays carried out biological and medical experiments on Mir for 16 days (the Cassiopée mission) before returning to Earth with Onufriyenko and Usachev.

Crew

References

Crewed Soyuz missions
Spacecraft launched in 1996